Enid Gabriella Coleman (usually known as Gabriella Coleman or Biella; born 1973) is an anthropologist, academic and author whose work focuses on cultures of hacking and online activism, particularly Anonymous. She previously held the Wolfe Chair in Scientific & Technological Literacy at McGill University, Montreal, Quebec, Canada and is currently a full professor at Harvard University's Department of Anthropology.

Education
After completing her high school education at St. John's School in San Juan, Puerto Rico, Coleman graduated with a Bachelor of Arts in religious studies from Columbia University in May 1996. She moved to the University of Chicago where she completed a Master of Arts in socio-cultural anthropology in August 1999.  She was awarded her PhD in socio-cultural anthropology for her dissertation The Social Construction of Freedom in Free and Open Source Software: Hackers, Ethics, and the Liberal Tradition in 2005.

Academic career
Coleman held positions including a postdoctoral fellowship at the Center for Cultural Analysis, Rutgers University and the Izaak Walton Killam Memorial Postdoctoral Fellowship, Program in Science, Technology & Society, University of Alberta before being appointed assistant professor of media, culture and communication at New York University in September 2007.

During 2010–2011, Coleman spent some time working at the Institute for Advanced Study in Princeton as the recipient of the "2010–11 Ginny and Robert Loughlin Founders' Circle Member in the School of Social Science".

In January 2012, she moved to Montreal, Quebec, Canada to take up the Wolfe Chair in Scientific & Technological Literacy at McGill University. The same year, she also spoke at Webstock 2012 in Wellington, New Zealand.

Study of Anonymous
Coleman's work on Anonymous has led to her becoming a regular media commentator in addition to her academic publications.  In July 2010, Coleman made reference to the Anonymous "project" or "operation" Chanology against the Church of Scientology and uses what would become a central motif in her descriptions of the group, the "trickster archetype", which she argues is "often not being a very clean and savory character, but perhaps vital for social renewal". Coleman states that she had "been thinking about the linkages between the trickster and hackers" for "a few years" before a stay in hospital led her to read Trickster Makes This World: Mischief, Myth, and Art by Lewis Hyde:

Coleman's theory concerning Anonymous (and associated groups such as 4chan) as the trickster has moved from academia to the mainstream media. Recent references include the three-part series on Anonymous in Wired magazine and the New York Times. Coleman has also been critical of some of the mainstream coverage of Anonymous. In Is it a Crime? The Transgressive Politics of Hacking in Anonymous (with Michael Ralph), Coleman responds to an article on the group by Joseph Menn in the Financial Times noting:

Our Weirdness Is Free: The logic of Anonymous — online army, agent of chaos, and seeker of justice, Triple Canopy 2012 January, is Coleman's first major piece of length on the group and draws from a range of observations of those she describes as "everything and nothing at once". Even Coleman admits she does not fully understand Anonymous, she told the BBC:

Coleman's multi-year ethnographic research on Anonymous culminated in the publication of Hacker Hoaxer Whistleblower Spy: The Many Faces of Anonymous. Awarded the American Anthropological Association's Diane Forsythe prize and described by Alan Moore, the co-author of V for Vendetta as "brilliantly lucid", the book charts the history, rise, and impact of the Anonymous movement. Even though the book deploys journalistic writing conventions, Coleman continues to analytically frame the activity of trolling and Anonymous in terms of tricksterism. She argues in her book that tricksters "are well positioned to impart lessons—regardless of their intent.". And continues to note:  “Their actions need not be accepted, much less endorsed, to extract positive value. We may see them as edifying us with liberating or terrifying perspectives, symptomatic of underlying problems that deserve scrutiny, functioning as a positive force toward renewal, or as distorting and confusing shadows.” The white nationalist troll weev, also treated as a foil to Anonymous, is presented as an example of the terrifying side of trickstermism, while Anonymous, argues Coleman, represents a more positive side, a force for political hope and renewal.

The issues of tricksters, trolls and Anonymous was further explored by a group of anthropologists in special issue of the Journal Hau that reviewed Coleman's book.

Publications

References

External links

 

Puerto Rican academics
Academic staff of McGill University
Living people
American anthropologists
American women anthropologists
Columbia College (New York) alumni
University of Chicago alumni
American expatriate academics
American expatriates in Canada
1973 births
American women academics